McArtor is a surname. Notable people with the surname include:

Gene McArtor, American baseball coach
T. Allan McArtor (born 1942), Administrator of the U.S. Federal Aviation Administration

See also
McCarter